Zavitne (Ukrainian: Zavitne, Russian: Заветное, Crimean Tatar: Yanış Taqıl)  is a village in the district of Lenine Raion in Crimea.

Georgraphy 
Kostyrine is located in the south-east of the district and the Kerch Peninsula, to the south of Tobechytske Lake.

References 

Populated coastal places in Ukraine